Premdas Katheria was a member of the 15th Lok Sabha of India. He represented the Etawah constituency of Uttar Pradesh and is a member of the Samajwadi Party.

Etawah constituency was reserved seat for scheduled caste category.

Education and background
Premdas holds a B.Ed. degree from Kanpur University, Kanpur, Uttar Pradesh. He was an agriculturist before joining politics.

Posts held

See also

List of members of the 15th Lok Sabha of India
Politics of India
Parliament of India
Government of India

References 

India MPs 2009–2014
Living people
1965 births
Samajwadi Party politicians
People from Etawah district
Lok Sabha members from Uttar Pradesh
Uttar Pradesh district councillors